St. Joseph Church in Prudnik, Poland, is a brick church, part of the Roman Catholic Diocese of Opole. It's located on the Józefa Poniatowskiego Street.

The church was built in 1866. It was partially destroyed during the battle of Prudnik in 1945. Archbishop Stefan Wyszyński was prisoned here from 1954 to 1955 by the communists.

See also 
 Saints Peter and Paul Church, Prudnik
 St. Michael's Church, Prudnik

References

External links 
 Sanktuarium św. Józefa - Prudnik-Las

Buildings and structures in Prudnik
Prudnik
19th-century Roman Catholic church buildings in Poland